Lithuanian Skating Federation or LČF is the national governing body of figure skating in Lithuania. The LČF organises the annual Lithuanian Figure Skating Championships.

References

External links 
Official website

Figure Skating
1996 establishments in Lithuania
Sports organizations established in 1996
National governing bodies for ice skating
Figure skating in Lithuania